Cletus Daho Nombil (born 23 August 2000) is a Ghanaian professional footballer who plays as a defensive midfielder for Israeli football club Hapoel Kfar Saba. He previously played for Ghanaian Premier League side Dreams F.C.

Career

Dreams 
Nombil started playing for the senior team of Dreams FC in 2018. He featured for the team during the GHALCA Top 8, but he made his debut during the 2018 Ghana Premier League season. On 17 March 2018, he made his debut playing 78 minutes in a 1–0 victory over Elmina Sharks. He played 4 league that season before the league was abandoned due to the dissolution of the GFA in June 2018, as a result of the Anas Number 12 Expose. During the 2019 GFA Normalization Committee Special Competition, he played 5 matches. He played 12 league matches during the 2019–20 Ghana Premier League season. Nombil joined Techiman Eleven Wonders in April 2020 on loan from Dreams, along teammate Abdul Jalilu prior to the start of the league, however he moved to Hapoel Jerusalem before the league commenced and so did not feature in any match for the club.

Hapoel Jerusalem 
In September 2020, Nombil signed for Israeli football club Hapoel Jerusalem, on a one-year loan deal, with an option to make it permanent the following year.

References

External links 

2000 births
Living people
Ghanaian footballers
Dreams F.C. (Ghana) players
Hapoel Jerusalem F.C. players
Hapoel Kfar Saba F.C. players
Ghana Premier League players
Liga Leumit players
Ghanaian expatriate footballers
Expatriate footballers in Israel
Ghanaian expatriate sportspeople in Israel
Association football midfielders